The 1982–83 Taça de Portugal was the 43rd edition of the Taça de Portugal, a Portuguese football knockout tournament organized by the Portuguese Football Federation (FPF). The 1982-83 Taça de Portugal began in September 1982. The final was played on 21 August 1983 at the Estádio Nacional.

Sporting CP were the previous holders, having defeated Braga 4–0 in the previous season's final. Cup holders Sporting CP were eliminated in the quarter finals by Benfica. Benfica defeated Porto, 1–0 in the final to win their eighteenth Taça de Portugal. As a result of Benfica winning both league and cup in the same season, cup runners-up Porto would face the cup holders in the 1983 Supertaça Cândido de Oliveira.

Fifth round
Ties were played on the 20 February.

Quarter-finals
Ties were played on the 2 April.

Semi-finals
Ties were played on the 8 May.

Final

References

Taça de Portugal seasons
1982–83 domestic association football cups
Taça